Events from the year 1633 in art.

Events

Works

Pieter Brueghel the Younger
Spring
Winter
Jacob Jordaens – The Golden Apple of Discord at the wedding of Peleus and Thetis
Hubert Le Sueur – Equestrian statue of Charles I (subsequently erected at Charing Cross, London)
Claude Lorrain
Coast View
Landscape with the Judgment of Paris
Rembrandt
Portrait of a Man Rising from His Chair
Portrait of a Young Woman with a Fan
The Shipbuilder and his Wife
The Storm on the Sea of Galilee
Sebastian Stoskopff
The Five Senses, or Summer
Anthony van Dyck
Charles I with M. de St Antoine
Self-portrait with a Sunflower
Venetia Digby on her Death Bed

Births
February 20 - Jan de Baen, Dutch portrait painter (died 1702)
March 26 (bapt.) - Mary Beale, English portrait painter (died 1699)
April - Willem Drost, Dutch painter and printmaker (died 1659)
December - Willem van de Velde the Younger, painter (died 1707)
date unknown
Agostino Bonisoli, Italian painter, active mainly in Cremona (died 1700)
Dirck Helmbreker, Dutch Golden Age painter and draughtsman (died 1696)
Emilio Taruffi, Italian painter of canvases and altarpieces, assassinated (died 1696)
Yun Shouping, Chinese painter of the Qing dynasty (died 1690)
probable
Hendrick Fromantiou, Dutch still life painter (died c.1693)
Jacob Huysmans, Flemish portrait painter (died 1696)

Deaths
February - Roelant Savery, Flanders-born Dutch baroque painter of the Golden Age (died 1576)
April - Pieter Lastman, Dutch painter (born 1583)
October - Jean LeClerc, painter (born c.1587)
October 2 - Scipione Borghese, art collector (born 1576)
November 3 - Lucio Massari, Italian painter of the School of Bologna (born 1569)
December 18 - Theodoor Galle, Flemish engraver (born 1571)
December 29 - Cornelis Claesz van Wieringen, Dutch marine painter (born 1580)
date unknown
Alessandro Bardelli, Italian painter (born 1583)
Miquel Bestard, Spanish painter from Majorca (born 1592)
Boetius à Bolswert, Dutch painter (born 1585)
Juan de Peñalosa, Spanish painter of altarpieces, a priest and poet (born 1579)
William Segar, portrait painter and officer of arms to the court of Elizabeth I of England (born 1554)
Giovanni Valesio,  Italian painter and engraver from Bologna (born 1583)
Jan de Wael I, Flemish painter of the Baroque period (born 1558)

 
Years of the 17th century in art
1630s in art